Lake Tairutu is a lake in the Far North District of Northland Region of New Zealand.

See also
List of lakes in New Zealand

References

Tairutu
Far North District